John Adams Nichols (September 23, 1848 – April 1, 1924) was an American farmer and politician from New York.

Life 
Nichols was born on September 23, 1848 in Derry, Rockingham County, New Hampshire. He was the son of Charles Nichols (1816–1887) and Lucy Ann Porter (1828–1876). When Nichols was 3, the family moved to Dewitt, New York where his father had a farm.

Nichols was educated in private schools in Oneida, Geneva, and Cambridge, Massachusetts. He ran a business venture with Daniel Lefevre under the name Nichols & Lefevre. The firm manufactured shotguns. He later became a farmer, and with 800 acres was one of the largest landowners in Onondaga County. He also was a joint proprietor of the Industrial Building in neighboring Syracuse.

In 1889, the Republican Nichols was elected supervisor for DeWitt, an unusual feat in the Democratic town. In 1891, Nichols was elected to the New York State Senate, representing the 25th District (Onondaga and Cortland counties).  He was in the State Senate in 1892 and 1893, but was defeated in the 1893 election by Charles W. Stapleton.

Nichols was married to Julia Gertrude Hall (1850-1928) and they had five children: Charles Henry (1870–1912), John Adams Jr. (1872–1949), Browning Hull (1874–1946), Lucy Gardner (1877–1952), and Leslis Anderson (1879–1971).

Nichols died on April 1, 1924 in Syracuse, Onondaga County, New York. He was buried in the Nichols family plot in Oakwood Cemetery.

References

External links 
Nichols Nominated in The Weekly Recorder on October 1, 1891.
Why John A. Nichols Should Be Elected State Senator in the Syracuse Evening Herald on October 31, 1891.
The New York Red Book. United States, Williams Press, 1892. Pp. 92–93.
John A. Nichols, Once in State Senate, is Dead in the Syracuse Herald on April 1, 1924.
The Political Graveyard
Find a Grave

1848 births
1924 deaths
Republican Party New York (state) state senators
19th-century American politicians
People from Derry, New Hampshire
People from DeWitt, New York
Politicians from Syracuse, New York
Burials at Oakwood Cemetery (Syracuse, New York)
Farmers from New York (state)